Appayya Dikshita (IAST , often "Dikshitar"), 1520–1593 CE, was a performer of yajñas as well as an expositor and practitioner of the Advaita Vedanta school of Hindu philosophy but with a focus on Shiva or Shiva Advaita.

Life

Appayya Dikshitar was born as Vinayaka Subramanian in Adayapalam, near Arani in the Tiruvannamalai district, in the Krishna Paksha of the Kanya month of Pramateecha Varsha under the Uttara Proushthapada constellation of the Hindu calendar. He belonged to the Vadadesa Vadama subsect .

His father’s name was Rangarajadhwari. Appaya had the name Vinayaka Subramanya after the Namakarana or naming ceremony took place. Acharya Dikshitar or Acchan Dikshitar was the younger brother of Appayya. Appayya studied the Hindu scriptures under his Guru, Rama Kavi. He completed the fourteen Vidyas at his young age.

Dikshitar travelled widely, entering into philosophical disputations and controversies in many centers of learning. He had the rare good fortune of being revered and patronized in his own lifetime by kings of Vellore, Tanjore, Vijayanagara, and Venkatagiri.

Works

 
He was well-read in every branch of Sanskrit learning and wrote as many works, large and small. Only 60 of them are, however, extant now. These include works on Vedanta,  Shiva Advaita, Mimamsa, Vyakarana, Kavya vyakhyana, Alankara, and devotional poetry.  By conviction, he was an advaitin, and true worship of Lord Siva was the religion of his heart. Though  the followers of the Shiva Advaita school claim him as belonging to their school,  it is not so easy to determine whether he was more inclined to Shiva Advaita or Advaita. Shiv Advaita is very much akin to Vishishtadvaita of Ramanuja, except for the role of Vishnu being taken by Shiva.

Dikshitar wrote the Chatur-mata-sara to illustrate the philosophical thoughts of the four prominent schools of interpretation of Brahma sutras. The Naya-manjari deals with advaita, the Naya-mani-mala with Srikanta mata, the Naya-mayukha-malika with Ramanuja's philosophy, and the Naya-muktavali with Madhva's philosophy.

Siddhanta lesha-sangraha
Among the Vedantic works of Appayya Dikshitar, the Siddhanta-lesha-sangraha is most famous. In this elaborate and original treatise, he brings together in one place, all different dialectical thinking belonging to the advaitic school. Traditional students of Vedanta begin their study of Vedantic commentaries only after studying this Siddhanta Lesha sangraha. All the different views of different subschools of advaita, like those of `eka-jiva-vada', `nana-jiva-vada', `bimba-pratibimba vada'  `sakshitva-vada' etc. are all discussed and the contrary views properly explained in this work with Appayya Dikshitar's masterly touch.

Parimala

It is a Vedantic work, an extremely readable commentary on the very difficult commentary called Kalpataru by an advaitic teacher named Amalananda. That Kalpataru is itself a commentary on Bhāmatī by Vācaspati Miśra, which in turn is the famous commentary on the Sutra-Bhashya of Adi Shankara. While the Parimala follows the advaitic approach, Dikshitar has written another commentary Sivaarka-mani-deepika on the Brahmasutras. But this is written from the point of view of Siva-visishtadvaita.. These two works – Sivaarka-mani-deepika and Parimala – are his magnum opus both in bulk and importance. Though both are commentaries on the Brahma sutra, Parimala aligns itself to the advaitic interpretation while the other work expounds on the Sivadvaita philosophy of Srikanta Shivacharya. Dikshitar's patron, King Chinna Bomma Nayak of Vellore, made endowments for the maintenance of a college of 500 scholars who studied Sivaarka maniDipika under Sri Dikshitar himself, thus equipping themselves for the Saivite propaganda work, which had been organized with a view to stemming the tide of Vaishnavite attacks and encroachments.

Other schools as approximations to advaita

Dikshitar graphically describes Shivadvaita and Advaita, which are very close to each other as the highest steps. He makes it clear in his work that Srikantha-Bhashya on the Brahmasutra has been written in very close approximation to the trend of thought of Adi Sankara in his own bhashya. Srikanta, according to Dikshitar, propagated his cult on the understanding that sagunopasana (Worship of name and form) is only the first step to nirgunopasana (Propitiation of the nameless and formless), and that it was the real intention of Srikanta that the final truth lies only in Advaita. Dikshitar's great dialectical skill is fully reflected in the work called 'Anandalahari chandrika', where he tries to narrow down the differences between the apparently divergent schools of thought.

Devotional hymns 
Among his works in devotional hymns, the 'Durga Chandrakala Stuti' is a profound work, and hailed by sages as a hymn, which if chanted with devotion, would invoke the blessings of Goddess Durga.

References

Sources
Special issue of Journal of Indian Philosophy (March 2016, edited by Christopher Minkowski):

Other (scholarly journal articles):

Still other:
N. Ramesan, Sri Appayya Dikshita (1972; Srimad Appayya Dikshitendra Granthavaliu Prakashana Samithi, Hyderabad, India)
 https://web.archive.org/web/20070111220640/http://www.shaivam.org/adappayya_works.htm

External links
Swami Sivananda on Appayya Dikshitar
By Descendant of Appayya, Palamadai Nilakanta Dikshitar
A brief history of Apayya Dikshitar

1520 births
1593 deaths
16th-century Hindu religious leaders
Advaitin philosophers
Indian Hindus
People from Tiruvannamalai district
16th-century Indian philosophers
Scholars from Tamil Nadu
Scholars of Vijayanagara Empire